David Fleeshman (born 11 July 1952) is a British actor, broadcaster, drama lecturer and theatre director with experience in film, radio, television, theatre and commercials.

Biography
Fleeshman was born on 11 July 1952 in Glasgow, Scotland, the son of Rosina and William Fleeshman. His family was Jewish. He trained at the Birmingham Theatre School making his stage debut was in 1973 with the Birmingham Repertory Theatre. In 1974 he took a position as actor/assistant stage manager at the Octagon Theatre, Bolton, and has also been an associate director of the Oldham Coliseum Theatre.

In 1978 he married actress Sue Jenkins, who played Gloria Todd on Coronation Street, 1985–1988, and Jackie Corkhill in the Channel 4 soap Brookside, 1991–2001. They have three children all currently working in the acting profession: Emily Fleeshman, Richard Fleeshman and Rosie Fleeshman.

Fleeshman has appeared in and directed numerous plays around the UK and abroad, including Arthur Miller's The Price, for which he won best actor in a supporting role at the Manchester Evening News Theatre Awards in 2005.

As a theatre director, he directed the European premiere of Neil Simon's Biloxi Blues, and the regional premiere of My Night With Reg, which won best production at the Manchester Evening News Theatre Awards.

Fleeshman's major television roles include Boys from the Blackstuff, Edge of Darkness, Silent Witness, and Trial and Retribution, comedy classics such as Only Fools and Horses and A Bit of a Do, as well as stints in Coronation Street, Brookside, Doctors, Emmerdale, and EastEnders. He has also recorded frequently for BBC Radio.

Filmography includes Pink Floyd – The Wall and Unstoppable.

From 2013 to 2015 he toured extensively with the Royal National Theatre's War Horse, which played to audiences at venues throughout the United Kingdom, Dublin and South Africa.
During 2016 Fleeshman portrayed the judge in Channel 4's National Treasure and played the leading role Charlie Resnick in Darkness, Darkness at the Nottingham Playhouse. From 2016 to 2019, he directed the Christmas pantomimes Aladdin, Snow White and the Seven Dwarfs and Peter Pan (starring Cannon and Ball and Chico Slimani), performed at Crewe Lyceum Theatre.

In 2018 he was nominated by the Manchester Theatre Awards as best supporting actor for his role as Uncle Vanya.

Selected television

 2022  Princess Mirror-Belle CBBC Series 2, episode 1 of 12  Wobblsday as Ted. 
 2022  Dodger Episode 5/10 as Doctor Quink 
 2022  The Teacher 
 2021  It's a Sin as husband
 1990–2018 Emmerdale (5 roles)  Barry  Hill, Charlie Aindow, John Wines, DI Drake, Rupert Jonas 
 2016 National Treasure
 2014 Silent Witness Episode: "Commodity" (2 parts)
 2012 The Mill* 2011 KJB: The Book That Changed the World
 2010 Accused
 2009 All the Small Things (TV series)
 2006 The Kindness of Strangers 
 2006 Grownups
 2005 Where the Heart Is
 2005 Spooks
 2004 Northern Lights
 2004 North & South
 2004 Bad Girls
 2003 The Royal
 2003–2008 Doctors (3 roles) Jon MacFarlane, Supt Dennis Rugg, Mike Dayman
 2002 The Falklands Play – Role, Denis Healey
 2001 The Six Wives of Henry VIII – Role, Thomas Cromwell
 2000 Life Force
 1997 Dalziel and Pascoe Episode: "Under World"
 1997–2002 Trial and Retribution
 1996 Hetty Wainthropp Investigates
 1995 The Bill
 1993–2009 Heartbeat (3 roles) Laski, Captain Jorgan, Frank Carter
 1992 Medics (UK TV series)
 1989 The Ruth Rendell Mysteries
 1989 Children's Ward – George's father
 1989 A Bit of a Do
 1988 Jim Henson's The Storyteller
 1986–1997 Brookside (3 roles) Model Agent, Dr Burton, David Hurst
 1985 Only Fools and Horses
 1985 Edge of Darkness (3 episodes)
 1985 The Practice (4 episodes)
 1981 Strangers
 1981 Boys from the Blackstuff
 1977 Crown Court
 1977–2005  Coronation Street (4 Roles) Morris Dancer, Paul Haines, Supt Jevons, Mr Austin

David Fleeshman television credits;
BFI:
IMDb:
TV.Com:
Actorole.com

Selected theatre

 2022 Pantomime - Gareth Gates, Jack and the Beanstalk, Hull New Theatre - Director. 
 2019 Pantomime - Cannon and Ball, Peter Pan – Director. Lyceum Theatre Crewe
 2018 Pantomime - Cannon and Ball, Jack and the Beanstalk – Director. Lyceum Theatre Crewe 
 2018  Romeo and Juliet as Friar Lawrence 
 2017 Pantomime – Cannon and Ball Snow White and the Seven Dwarfs – Director. Lyceum Theatre Crewe
 2017 Uncle Vanya HOME as Professor Serebrayakov
 2017 Score – !VIVA! Spanish film festival 
 2016  Aladdin Pantomime – Director, starring Cannon and Ball, and Sidney Sloane, Crewe Lyceum Theatre.
 2016 John Harvey's Darkness, Darkness – leading role of Charlie Resnick, Nottingham Playhouse
 2016  Chamaco, HOME
 2015  JB Shorts 14, Emily, Reallife Theatre Company at Joshau Brooks, Manchester – Director 
 2013 I Am Janet, Halle St Peters Manchester – Director 
 2013–2015 War Horse, Toured Plymouth, Birmingham, Salford, Edinburgh, Southampton, Dublin, Sunderland, Bradford, Cardiff and South Africa.
 2013 Of Mice and Men, Octagon Theatre, Bolton
 2012 Lighthearted Intercourse, Octagon Theatre, Bolton
 2012  Gypsy Curve (theatre) Leicester
 2011 Cinderella Pantomime, Manchester Opera House as Baron Hardup
 2011 Hard Times, Manchester Library Theatre
 2010  Peter Pan The Lowry, Salford Quays – Director
 2010  Glengarry Glen Ross, Manchester Library Theatre
 2009  Aladdin Pantomime, Civic Theatre Darlington – Director
 2007 Death of a Salesman, Octagon Theatre, Bolton
 2006  Night of the Stars II Palace Theatre, Manchester
 2005  The Price, Manchester Library Theatre, with Sue Jenkins
 2004  The Wizard of Oz (2004 musical), The Lowry, Salford Quays – Director
 1993  A Midsummer Night's Dream, Manchester Library Theatre
 1992 Assassins, Manchester Library Theatre

Selected film and video
 2017 Disobedience
 2016 Running on Glass
 2013 The Other Child (2013) 
 2011  KJB: The Book That Changed the World
 2009 Capture Anthologies: Fables & Fairytales (Video) 
 2008 Mother Mine
 2004 Unstoppable
 2004 Christmas Lights
 1988 Nature of the Beast
 1982  Pink Floyd – The Wall

Selected radio/audio

2019 BBC Digital Audio The Silver Sword 
2018 BBC Radio 4 The Blood Painting 
2017 BBC Radio 4 MetaphorMoses
2017 BBC Radio 4 The Book of Yehudit
2016 BBC Radio 4 Blood Sex and Money by Emile Zola with Glenda Jackson
2015 BBC Radio 4 Brief Lives
 2013 BBC Radio 4 Afternoon Play: Stone 
 2012 BBC Radio 3 The Wire
 2010 BBC Radio 4  Afternoon Play: Andy Walker – The Man Who Jumped From Space 
 2009 BBC Radio 7  Who's Jimmy Dickenson? with Sue Jenkins
 2007 BBC Radio 4  The Saturday Play: Playing with Fire 
 2006 BBC Radio 4 The Archers
 2004 BBC Radio 4  Afternoon Play: The Kon-Tiki 2 Expedition 
 2002 BBC Radio 4   Three Ivans, Two Aunts and an Overcoat
 2000 BBC Radio 4  Afternoon Play: The Fish 
 1997 BBC Radio 4  The Monday Play: King Matt 
 1996 BBC Radio 4  Thirty Minute Theatre: The Queen of Revenge
 1994 BBC Radio 4   Hobson's Choice
 1993 BBC Radio 4  The Naked Nuns
 1990 BBC Radio 4 A Room in Budapest
 1988 BBC Radio 4 Saturday-Night Theatre: The Dwelling Place by Catherine Cookson
 1985 BBC Radio 4  Thirty-Minute Theatre Top Tips
 1983 BBC Radio 4 Afternoon Theatre: Blinded by the Light 
 1981 BBC Radio 4 The Monday Play: The Liberation 
 1980 BBC Radio 4  Afternoon Theatre: Feast of all Fools 
 1979 BBC Radio 4  The Monday Play: Grass Roots 
 1978 BBC Radio 4 Afternoon Theatre: The Last Stand of Sergeant-Major Featherstone
 1974  BBC Radio 4 Afternoon Theatre: A Deadly Wit 

David Fleeshman radio credits; BBC Genome <

Awards
 Manchester Theatre Awards. Nominated as best supporting actor for the role of Uncle Vanya.
 Manchester Evening News Theatre Awards. Won best actor in a supporting role in Arthur Miller's The Price
 Manchester Evening News Theatre Awards. Won best production for My Night With Reg.

The Actors' Lab
Fleeshman is a co-founder director of The Actors' Lab, MediaCityUK, Salford. and a patron of the 24:7 Theatre Festival.

References

External links
 

1952 births
Living people
20th-century British male actors
21st-century British male actors
British male radio actors
British male stage actors
British male television actors
British theatre directors
Male actors from Leeds